Bettina or Bessie Walker (1837 – 4 February 1893) was an Irish pianist and composer.

Biography
Walker was born in Dublin, the daughter of physician William Augustus Walker, who died in 1838. Walker studied in the 1870s, first with William Sterndale Bennett in London and Carl Tausig in Berlin and Giovanni Sgambati in Rome. In 1883 she came to Weimar and continued her studies with Franz Liszt. She also studied under Ludwig Deppe, Xaver Scharwenka and Adolf Henselt.

After Henselt's death in 1889 she settled in Fulham, London, where she taught her piano methodology, but died four years later.

Of lasting importance are her memoirs, in which she details her numerous encounters with important musicians.

References

Works

Bibliography
 Monthly Bulletin of the Carnegie Library of Pittsburgh, Volume 11 (1906), S. 327

1837 births
1893 deaths
Irish classical composers
Irish women classical composers
Irish classical pianists
Irish expatriates in England
Women classical pianists
Pupils of Adolf Henselt
Pupils of Franz Liszt
19th-century women pianists